This is a list of universities in Guadeloupe.

Universities 
 University of the French West Indies and Guiana - Two Guadeloupe campuses (Pointe-à-Pitre and Saint-Claude)

See also 
 List of universities by country

References

Guadeloupe
Guadeloupe

Lists of organizations based in Guadeloupe